Ron Barling (28 September 1912 – 11 March 2001) was an  Australian rules footballer who played with Geelong in the Victorian Football League (VFL).

Notes

External links 

1912 births
2001 deaths
Australian rules footballers from Victoria (Australia)
Geelong Football Club players